A Faithful Soldier of Pancho Villa is a 1967 Mexican drama film written, directed by and starring Emilio Fernández. It was entered into the 5th Moscow International Film Festival.

Cast
 Emilio Fernández as Aurelio Pérez
 Maricruz Olivier as Amalia Espinosa
 Carlos López Moctezuma as Gonzalo de los Monteros
 Sonia Amelio as María Dolores
 José Eduardo Pérez as Comandante Pérez
 José Trinidad Villa
 Jorge Pérez Hernández
 Aurora Cortés
 Celia Viveros
 Margarita Cortés
 Leonor Gómez
 Margarito Luna
 Salvador Godínez

References

External links
 

1967 films
1967 drama films
Mexican drama films
1960s Spanish-language films
Films directed by Emilio Fernández
1960s Mexican films